Belhezar-e Bala (also Romanized as Belhezār-e Bālā; also known as Belhezar-e ‘Olyā) is a village in Qarah Chaman Rural District, Arzhan District, Shiraz County, Fars Province, Iran. At the 2006 census, its population was 109, in 29 families.

References 

Populated places in Shiraz County